Amdocs is a multinational corporation that was founded in Israel and currently headquartered in Chesterfield, Missouri, with support and development centers located worldwide. The company specializes in software and services for communications, media and financial services providers and digital enterprises.

History 
The company was founded in 1982  in Israel as an offshoot of Golden Pages, the Israeli phone directory company, which was owned by the Aurec Group headed by Morris Kahn. In 1982, Boaz Dotan became Amdocs' first President and CEO. Together with others at Golden Pages, Kahn developed a billing software program for phone directory companies and with Boaz Dotan established a company called Aurec Information & Directory Systems to market this product.

In 1985, Southwestern Bell Corporation acquired a 50 percent ownership share of Aurec Information & Directory Systems, and its name was changed to Amdocs. Within two years, the Aurec Group sold off all its holdings in Amdocs for almost US$1 billion.

Between 1990 and 1995 Amdocs took its initial diversification steps, expanding first into the wireline telephony arena and then the mobile space. Over the years, Amdocs has continued to expand its product and services offerings. In 1995, Avi Naor replaced Boaz Dotan as president and CEO of Amdocs.

The company went public on the New York Stock Exchange in June 1998, moving to the NASDAQ Global Select Market in 2014.

Amdocs entered the managed services space in 1999 with the acquisition of ITDS.

Amdocs acquired software firm Clarify in 2001 for $200 million. In 2002, Dov Baharav replaced Avi Naor as Amdocs' President and CEO.

In 2005, Amdocs acquired billing and CRM provider DST Innovis for $238 million. In 2006, Amdocs acquired Cramer Systems.

Amdocs acquired Israeli startup SigValue in 2007 for $85 million. In 2008, Amdocs acquired Irish software company Changing Worlds for $60 million.

In November 2010, Eli Gelman replaced Dov Baharav as Amdocs' President and CEO. Also in 2010, Amdocs acquired MX Telecom for $104 million.

In 2011, Amdocs acquired Bridgewater Systems. The company acquired Celcite in 2013 for $129 million. Also in 2013, Amdocs acquired Actix.

In 2015, Amdocs acquired a majority of Comverse BSS for $272 million.

In 2016, a subsidiary of Amdocs was created, named "Vector Creations Limited", which employed the team working on the Matrix protocol and software. Funding by Amdocs was announced to be cut in July 2017, leading to the Matrix core team creating their own UK-based company, "New Vector Limited".

In September 2016, Amdocs acquired Silicon Valley based Vindicia, Tel Aviv-based company Pontis, and Irish software company Brite:Bill.

In late 2017, Amdocs acquired Kenzan Media. In 2018, Amdocs acquired projekt202.

In 2018, Amdocs acquired Vubiquity for $224 million. Following the acquisition, former Vubiquity CEO Darcy Antonellis became head of Amdocs Media Division. Also in 2018, Amdocs acquired Canadian company UXP Systems.

In October 2018, Shuky Sheffer replaced Eli Gelman as Amdocs' President and CEO.

In January 2020, Amdocs donated resources including food packs to Globe Telecom as part of aid operations for Filipino communities affected by the eruption of Taal volcano. These donations came as part of Amdocs Corporate Social Responsibility program.

In July 2020, Amdocs acquired Openet Telecom Inc., a provider of 5G charging, policy and cloud technologies.

On 5 August 2020, Amdocs reported that Orange Liberia has collaborated with Amdocs to update its end-to-end digital enabling infrastructure.

On 8 March 2021, Amdocs Media’s Vindicia and Vimeo extended long-term engagement to enable Vimeo’s global SaaS video platform.

In 2021, Vibiquity announced it renewed its agreement with izzi, a cable tv operator in Mexico.

In May 2022, Amdocs announced it has acquired the UK-headquartered SaaS-based cloud network and service assurance solutions for communications service providers, MYCOM OSI for US$188 million.

Controversy 
In early 2000, federal agencies conducted a counterintelligence investigation to determine if Amdocs was being used by Israel to eavesdrop on U.S. government communications. The investigation found no evidence of such activity.

According to the Spy Cables (a series of leaked documents from global intelligence agencies), in 2009 the South African State Security Agency suspected Amdocs was being used by Mossad to spy on South African citizens by tapping mobile phones to gather information.

See also
 Matrix (protocol)
 VOIP telephony
 Amdocs (Israel) Ltd. v. Openet Telecom, Inc.

References

External links
 Official Website

 
1982 establishments in Israel
Companies listed on the Nasdaq
Companies formerly listed on the New York Stock Exchange
Companies based in Chesterfield, Missouri
Software companies established in 1982
Customer relationship management software companies
Software companies based in Missouri
Software companies of Israel
Private equity portfolio companies
Telecommunications Billing Systems
1982 establishments in Missouri
1998 initial public offerings
Software companies of the United States